= Collins Lake (Portage County, Wisconsin) =

Lake in the state of Wisconsin, United States

- Location within Wisconsin Location within the United States
- Location: Wisconsin
- Coordinates: 44°36′02″N 89°20′31″W
- Type: lake
- Etymology: W. F. Collins
- Basin countries: United States
- Surface elevation: 1,138 ft (347 m)

Collins Lake is a lake in the U.S. state of Wisconsin.

Collins Lake was named in the 1950s after W. F. Collins, a county boardmember.
